Amarilis Villar Mayorga (born 30 March 1984 in Vargas) is a volleyball player from Venezuela, who competed for her native country at the 2008 Summer Olympics in Beijing, China. Her team ended up in 8th place.

Clubs
 Vargas (2001–2010)

Awards

National team

Senior team
 2007 South American Championship -  Bronze medal
 2005 Bolivarian Games -  Silver medal
 2002 Central American and Caribbean Games  Silver medal
 2001 South American Championship -  Bronze medal
 2001 Bolivarian Games -  Silver medal

Junior team
 South America Junior Continental Championship U-20 -  Silver medal

References

External links
 FIVB profile

1984 births
Living people
Olympic volleyball players of Venezuela
Venezuelan women's volleyball players
Volleyball players at the 2008 Summer Olympics
Central American and Caribbean Games silver medalists for Venezuela
Competitors at the 2002 Central American and Caribbean Games
Central American and Caribbean Games medalists in volleyball
People from Vargas (state)
20th-century Venezuelan women
21st-century Venezuelan women